The 2006 State Twenty20 Cricket Knock-Out Tournament was a domestic Twenty20 tournament in New Zealand. The tournament was held in Invercargill on 10-12 November 2006. 

A prize of $30,000 was on offer for the winners of the tournament. Teams representing the six senior cricket associations of New Zealand (Auckland, Northern Districts, Wellington, Central Districts, Canterbury and Otago) took part, but owing to inclement weather only 4 of the 9 scheduled matches took place.

Venues
 Queen's Park
 Southland Boys' High School

Results
{| class="wikitable"
|- bgcolor="#efefef"
! Date
! Team
! Team
! Result
! Venue
|-
|| 10 November 2006 || Canterbury 152-8 (20 overs) || Auckland 153-7 (18.1 overs) || Auckland won by 3 wickets || Southland Boys' High School
|-
|| 10 November 2006 || Otago 174-8 (20 overs) || Northern Districts 177-6 (20 overs) || Northern Districts won by 4 wickets || Southland Boys' High School
|-
|| 11 November 2006 || Auckland 140-7 (20 overs) || Central Districts 99-5 (11 overs) || Central Districts won by 19 runs D/L Method || Queens Park
|-
|| 11 November 2006 || Wellington 185-6 (20 overs) || Northern Districts 113-7 (14 overs)|| Wellington won by 27 runs D/L Method || Southland Boys' High School
|-
|| 11 November 2006 || Wellington || Canterbury || Abandoned without a ball being bowled || Queens Park
|-
|| 11 November 2006 || Otago || Central Districts || Abandoned without a ball being bowled || Southland Boys' High School
|-
|| 12 November 2006 (Semi-Final No 1) || Wellington|| Auckland || Abandoned without a ball being bowled || Queens Park
|-
|| 12 November 2006 (Semi-Final No 2) || Central Districts || Northern Districts || Abandoned without a ball being bowled || Southland Boys' High School
|-
|| 12 November 2006 (Final) || Wellington|| Central Districts || Abandoned without a ball being bowled || Queens Park
|}

References

New Zealand domestic cricket competitions
Domestic cricket competitions in 2006–07
2006–07 New Zealand cricket season